Chieveley  is a village and large civil parish centred  north of Newbury in Berkshire, close to the M4 motorway and A34 road. Chieveley services are within the parish.

Geography

The landscape is of gently rolling chalk hills. The land is predominantly arable with some dairy, sheep and pigs. There is a healthy quantity of woodland and abundant wildlife. There is a network of green lanes and footpaths that afford good walking. The northern end of Chieveley village is known as Downend. As well as Chieveley, the civil parish also consists of the village of Curridge and the hamlets of Oare and Snelsmore Common. The original parish also included Leckhampstead and Winterbourne as well. 

The structure has been much affected by roads. The M4 motorway, opened in 1971, passes east–west through the middle of the parish and has done much to cut Curridge and Oare off from Chieveley. The A34, a major trunk road, running north–south, quarters the parish. Its path has moved several times, the most recent development being a change to Junction 13 that opened in Autumn 2004. Chieveley services is at junction 13 of the M4, where these two roads meet. The landscape is dominated by farming. There are currently three working farms in the parish. Other industries include a garden centre, land-fill site, hotels, a baker and some small businesses.

History
There is ancient civilisation nearby that indicates early settlement. The parish has an Iron Age hill fort in Snelsmore, called Bussock Camp. This is in private grounds, but is visible in May when they are opened to the public to view the bluebells. The name Chieveley is said to be derived from "Field of Chives". The Women's Institute's Berkshire Book assures the reader that chives were noted in the area as far back as 951. This is the same year that King Eadred gave the village to his bailiff, Wulf. The Domesday Book of 1086 says this of Chieveley:
In Rowbury Hundred
The abbey itself holds Chieveley. It has always held it. TRE (in the reign of Edward the Confessor) it was assessed at 27 hides; now at 7½ hides with land for 20 ploughs. In demesne are 3 ploughs; and 28 villains and 10 bordars with 18 ploughs. The whole, TRE and afterwards, was worth 12l; now the abbot's portion is worth 10l; that of his men 50s. shillings

This text is a structured shorthand tax assessment and identifies 39 men, many of whom would have had their own households, and three serfs, a form of slavery done away with early in the feudal system, generally in the era of Magna Carta. In August 1207, King John seems to have had a good few days' hunting in West Berkshire. He is reported in Curridge on the 3rd and Chieveley on the 5th. Chieveley once had its own maypole, on the site now occupied by Maypole Cottage (on the corner of the High Street and Church Lane).

St Mary's Church
It is likely that there was a Saxon church before it was replaced by the Normans.  The present church is a Grade II* listed building and visible parts date from the 13th century.  The chancel and lower stage of the bell tower date from then with the upper part of the tower from the following century.  The 15th century saw the insertion of a window in the south-west of the chancel and the font is of this period.  The church was heavily restored in the 19th century including rendering and buttresses outside.  Chieveley parish registers start on 10 April 1560. There are still several families in the area who were recorded in those annals.  The first vicar of Chieveley was Elias, appointed in 1154.

Transport
Chieveley is served by bus services 6, 6A and 107 from Newbury.

Demography

Notable residents
Robert Goff, Baron Goff of Chieveley (1926-2016), Senior Law Lord (1996-1998), Lord of Appeal in Ordinary (1986-1998), who lived in Chieveley House
The mother of Lord Chief Justice Holt.

References

Much of the text for this page was originally taken, with permission, from MyChieveley.co.uk.

External links
 British History Online: Chieveley Parish

 
Villages in Berkshire
Civil parishes in Berkshire
West Berkshire District